Dedham Granite is a light grayish-pink to greenish-gray, equigranular to slightly porphyritic, variably altered, granite south and west of Boston, named for the town of Dedham, Massachusetts.

Qualities
Dedham Granite includes dioritic rock near Scituate and Cohasset and Barefoot Hills Quartz Monzonite. Intrudes Zdi, Zgb, Zb, Zv. Extensive calc-alkaline plutons separated by Boston basin have long been mapped as Dedham. Those to the north of Boston and studied by the US Geological Survey, are referred to as Dedham North. Crystallization ages for the Dedham North suite (based on titanites and zircons) have been determined at 607+/-4 Ma, while ages for the Lynn are slightly younger at 596+/-3 Ma. Both are clearly part of the Late Proterozoic magmatic event.

Dates on two samples from Sheffield Heights indicate that the diorite and granite are part of the Dedham North suite. The Dedham south and west of Boston has been dated at 630+/15 Ma. Dedham North Granite has a compositionally highly variable suite ranging from leucogranites to granodiorites, tonalites, and quartz diorite. The granites originated by partial melting of a sedimentary protolith, while the intermediate members show a mixing of granitic magma and mafic magma.

Uses
The rock has been used for many notable building projects in and around Dedham.  It was used for St. Mary's Church (1880), St. Paul's Church (1858), Memorial Hall (1868), the Boston and Providence Railroad station (1882), the Dedham Public Library (1888), Trinity Church in Copley Square.

There are several pieces of it arranged decoratively along East Street in Dedham, between High and Avery Streets.  These pieces were remnants of the railroad abutment that was dismantled in 2008.  Plymouth Rock is also a piece of Dedham Granite, having been moved to the coast by a glacier 20,000 years ago.

References

Geologic formations of Massachusetts
Ediacaran geology
Dedham, Massachusetts